The Mercedes-Benz M112 engine is a gasoline-fueled, 4-stroke, spark-ignition, internal-combustion automobile piston V6 engine family used in the 2000s. Introduced in 1998, it was the first V6 engine ever built by Mercedes. A short time later the related M113 V8 was introduced.

All are built in Bad Cannstatt, Germany except the supercharged C32 AMG, which is assembled in Affalterbach, Germany.

All M112 engines have silicon/aluminum (Alusil) engine blocks with a 90° vee angle. The aluminum SOHC cylinder heads have 3 valves per cylinder. All use sequential fuel injection with two spark plugs per cylinder. All have forged steel connecting rods, a one-piece cast camshaft, iron-coated aluminum pistons and a magnesium intake manifold. To deal with the vibration problems of a 90 degree V6, a balancer shaft was installed in the engine block between the cylinder banks. This essentially eliminated first and second order vibration problems (see engine balance). A dual-length Variable Length Intake Manifold is fitted to optimise engine flexibility.

E24

The E24 is a  version. The compression ratio is 10.0:1.

Applications:

 1996–2000 W202 C 240
 1998–2000  W210  E 240

E26
The E26 is a  version. The compression ratio is raised to 10.5:1.

Applications:
 2000–2005 W203 C 240
 2000–2002 W210 E 240
 2003–2005 W211 E 240
 2002–2005 C209 CLK 240

E28
The E28 is a  version. The compression ratio is 10.0:1.

Applications:
 1998–2000 W202 C 280
 1998–2006 W220 S 280
 1998–2001 R129 SL 280
 1998–2002 W210 E 280

E32
The E32 is a  version. The compression ratio is 10.0:1. It has fracture-split forged steel connecting rods.

Applications:
 2000–2005 C 320
 1998–2005 E 320
 1997–2006 G 320
 1998–2002 S 320
 1998–2003 ML 320
 2000–2003 SLK 320
 1998–2005 CLK 320
 2003–2015 Viano 3.0/Vito 119 (W639)
 2004–2008 Chrysler Crossfire

E 32 ML

A water-to-air intercooler made by Garrett is fitted beneath the supercharger inside the V, with a 0.8L Heat-Exchanger mounted under the bumper run by an electric water pump. The compression ratio is 9.0:1.

Applications:
 2001–2003 C 32 AMG
 2001–2003 SLK 32 AMG
 2002 A 32K AMG
 2005–2006 Chrysler Crossfire SRT-6

E37
The E37 is a  version. The compression ratio is 10.0:1.

Applications:
 2003–2005 ML 350
 2003–2006 S 350
 2003–2006 SL 350
 2004–2008 V 350

See also
 List of Mercedes-Benz engines

References

M112
V6 engines
Gasoline engines by model